Deborah Danner, 66, was fatally shot by New York Police Department Sgt. Hugh Barry on October 18, 2016, in her home in the Bronx, New York. According to police sources, she was armed with first a pair of scissors and then a baseball bat. According to an emergency medical technician, she had put the scissors down, and later on picked up a baseball bat. Barry was charged with murder and manslaughter in May 2017. He was acquitted in February 2018.

On October 18, 2016, a neighbor called 911 at 6:05 p.m. and reported that Danner was erratic. Police had been called to her apartment before. According to the police, Danner had scissors, and Barry talked her into putting them down. Then she picked up a baseball bat and swung at him. Barry shot Danner twice, fatally wounding her. He was the only officer in the bedroom, although others were on the scene.

According to court testimony by Brittney Mullings, an emergency medical technician, Mullings had arrived before Barry. Danner had put down the scissors and Mullings was talking to her. Danner was not holding anything in her hands. Mullings was trying to explain to Danner why they had arrived. Barry then arrived, and did not talk to Mullings or Danner. The police interrupted their conversation, and Danner retreated into her bedroom. Six police officers followed Danner into her bedroom, and a minute later, Mullings heard two shots.

Background
Danner was mentally ill and had written an essay, "Living With Schizophrenia", in 2012. She was a parishioner who regularly attended Trinity Church Wall Street, and was active in that community's groups and ministries.

Aftermath 
Less than six hours after the death, Sergeant Barry was placed on administrative duty and stripped of his badge and gun. According to The New York Times, "Mayor Bill de Blasio said at a news conference that the sergeant had not followed training or protocols for dealing with those with mental illness, and for some reason had neither used his Taser nor waited for specialized officers trained to deal with such situations."

The death of Danner, who was black, spurred a protest on October 19. Protestors marched from her apartment building to the 43rd Precinct station house. Marchers included members of the New York Black Lives Matter chapter.

Barry was arrested and charged with second-degree murder on May 31, 2017.  Fraught with cronyism and corruption, Bronx County District Attorney, Darcel D. Clark's prosecution of Barry ultimately lead to an acquittal on all charges.  On February 14, 2018, Barry was acquitted by a judge in a non-jury trial.

References

2016 in New York City
African-American-related controversies
Black Lives Matter
African Americans shot dead by law enforcement officers in the United States
Deaths by firearm in the Bronx
Deaths by person in New York City
New York City Police Department
October 2016 events in the United States
2010s in the Bronx